Hiding Place is an album from contemporary Christian group Selah. It was released in 2004.

Track listing

"You Raise Me Up" (Brendan Graham, Rolf Løvland) – 5:02
"Part the Waters Lord"/"I Need Thee Every Hour" (Charles F. Brown, Annie S. Hawks, Robert Lowry) – 3:09
"I Bless Your Name" (Wayne Goodine) – 3:50
"Essengo" – 4:22
"All My Praise" (Audrey Hatcher) – 4:37
"There Is Power in the Blood" (Lewis Jones) – 3:06
"You Are My Hiding Place" (Michael Ledner) – 4:21
"Through It All" (Andraé Crouch) – 2:49
"By and By (We'll Understand It Better By and By)" (Jim Smith, Marcella Smith, Todd Smith, Charles Tindley) – 3:28
"O the Deep, Deep Love of Jesus" (Samuel Francis, Thomas Williams) – 6:13
"All of Me" (Terry Wade Haynes) – 2:58
"Before the Throne of God Above" (Charitie Bancroft, Vikki Cook) – 3:43

Personnel
Selah
 Allan Hall – lead vocals (1, 3, 5, 8, 12), backing vocals, acoustic piano (2, 3, 5-8, 10, 11, 12), arrangements (2, 6, 10)
 Todd Smith – lead vocals (1, 3-12), backing vocals, arrangements (4, 6, 9, 10)
 Nicol Sponberg – lead vocals (1-8, 10, 12), backing vocals, arrangements (2, 4, 6, 10)

Musicians
 Morten Schjolin – keyboards (1), programming (1), drums (1), percussion (1)
 Gordon Mote – organ (3, 6, 8), keyboards (10)
 Jakk Kincaid – electric guitar (3-6, 8, 10)
 Jerry McPherson – electric guitar (3-6, 8, 10)
 Biff Watson – acoustic guitar (3-6, 8, 10), mandocello (4)
 David Hungate – bass (3-6, 8, 10)
 Steve Brewster – drums (3-6, 8, 10)
 Eric Darken – percussion (3-9, 11, 12)
 John Mock – tin whistle (12)
 James Halliwell – string arrangements (1)
 Paul Mills – string arrangements (2, 7, 11, 12)
 Anthony LaMarchina – cello (2, 7, 11)
 Robert Mason – cello (2, 7, 11)
 Sarighani Reist – cello (2, 7, 11, 12)
 Monisa Angell – viola (2, 7, 11)
 Jim Grosjean – viola (2, 7, 11)
 Kristin Wilkinson – viola (2, 7, 11, 12)
 David Angell – violin (2, 7, 11), concertmaster (2, 7, 11), first violin (12)
 Conni Ellisor – violin (2, 7, 11)
 Cate Myer – violin (2, 7, 11)
 Pamela Sixfin – violin (2, 7, 11), second violin (12)
 Christian Teal – violin (2, 7, 11)
 Alan Umstead – violin (2, 7, 11)
 Catherine Umstead – violin (2, 7, 11)
 Mary Kathryn Vanosdale – violin (2, 7, 11)
 Kim Fleming  – choir vocals (1)
 Vicki Hampton – choir vocals (1, 3, 6, 8)
 Scat Springs – choir vocals (1, 3, 6, 8)
 Wendy Moten – choir vocals (3, 6, 8)
 Abby Smith – backing vocals (4)
 Angie Smith – backing vocals (4)
 Ellie Smith – backing vocals (4)
 Greg Sponberg – backing vocals (4)
 Laban Smith – spoken intro (9)

Production 
 Producers – Morten Schjolin (Track 1); Allan Hall, Todd Smith, Nicol Sponberg and Jason Kyle (Tracks 2-12, additional production on Track 1).
 A&R – Bryan Stewart 
 Tracking Engineers – Jason Kyle and Craig White 
 String sessions on Tracks 2, 7, 11 & 12 recorded by Craig White, assisted by Jason Kyle.
 Assistant Engineers – Ryan Lynn, Greg Strizek and John Thompson.
 Mixed by Jason Kyle and Matt Lambert 
 Mastered by Doug Sax and Robert Hadley at The Mastering Lab (Hollywood, California).
 Art Direction and Design – Glenn Sweitzer
 Photography – Russ Harrington 
 Management – Brian Jannsen
 Wardrobe Stylist – Star Klem
 Hair and Make-up – Melissa Schleicher

Awards

At the 36th GMA Dove Awards, the album was nominated to four Dove Awards, including Inspirational Album of the Year. The song "You Raise Me Up" was nominated to Song of the Year and Inspirational Recorded Song of the Year. The song "I Bless Your Name" was also nominated for Worship Song of the Year.

Charts

Certifications

References

2004 albums
Curb Records albums
Selah (band) albums